John Gardner Griffin (October 30, 1815 – September 13, 1904) was a member of the Wisconsin State Assembly.

Biography
Griffin was born on October 30, 1815 in East Haddam, Connecticut. On March 27, 1841, he married Ursula Mack. They had three children. Griffin settled on a farm in Courtland, Wisconsin that had been owned by his father, Nathan. Nathan Griffin was Supervisor and Chairman of Courtland and a Commissioner of Columbia County, Wisconsin. Griffin was a Methodist.

Political career
Griffin was a Republican member of the Assembly during the Legislature of 1876. Previously a Free Soiler, he was twice a candidate for the Connecticut General Assembly. Other positions he held include justice of the peace.

References

External links

People from East Haddam, Connecticut
People from Columbia County, Wisconsin
Republican Party members of the Wisconsin State Assembly
American justices of the peace
Connecticut Free Soilers
Methodists from Wisconsin
19th-century Methodists
Farmers from Wisconsin
1815 births
1904 deaths